Foul Play is a 1920 British silent crime film directed by Edwin J. Collins and starring Renee Kelly, Henry Hallett and Randolph McLeod. It is adapted from the 1869 novel Foul Play by Charles Reade.

Plot
In Victorian England, a clergyman is wrongly transported to Australia for a crime he did not commit.

Cast
 Renee Kelly ...  Helen Rollaston 
 Henry Hallett ...  Penfold 
 Randolph McLeod ...  Wardlow 
 Cecil Morton York ...  Mr. Wardlow 
 C. Hargrave Mansell ...  Reverend Penfold 
 Charles Vane ...  General Rollaston 
 N. Watt-Phillips ...  Joseph Wylie

References

External links

1920 films
British crime films
Films directed by Edwin J. Collins
Films based on British novels
British black-and-white films
British silent feature films
1920 crime films
1920s English-language films
1920s British films